Micah Franklin (born 2 September 1992) is a Bermudian professional squash player. As of February 2018, he was ranked number 223 in the world.

References

1992 births
Living people
Bermudian male squash players
Squash players at the 2014 Commonwealth Games
Squash players at the 2018 Commonwealth Games
Commonwealth Games competitors for Bermuda
Squash players at the 2019 Pan American Games
Pan American Games competitors for Bermuda